Cwm Caseg is a broad glacial valley in Snowdonia leading west from the Carneddau towards Bethesda. It is bordered by Carnedd Llewelyn to the southeast, Yr Elen to the west, and Foel Grach to the northeast. It contains a small lake, Ffynnon Caseg.

References

Bethesda, Gwynedd
Llanllechid
Valleys of Gwynedd
Valleys of Snowdonia